Kashkuiyeh (also Romanized as Kashkū’īyeh; also known as Kashkoo’eyeh Dasht Ab, Kāshkūh, and Kashkū’īyeh-ye Dasht-e Āb) is a village in Dashtab Rural District, in the Central District of Baft County, Kerman Province, Iran. At the 2006 census, its population was 871, in 185 families.

Weather & Climate 
The climate of Kashkuyeh is temperate and dry. The summers of this city are relatively hot and the winters are cold.

References 

Populated places in Baft County